Joseph Michael Callahan (born December 20, 1982) is an American former professional ice hockey defenseman who played in the National Hockey League. Callahan was born in Brockton, Massachusetts, but grew up in nearby Abington.

Playing career
Callahan was drafted 70th overall in the 2002 NHL Entry Draft by the Phoenix Coyotes. After three years of Collegiate Hockey with Yale University, he made his professional debut with the Coyotes affiliate, the Springfield Falcons of the AHL, at the end of the 2003–04 season.

After three years with the Coyotes' minor league affiliates, Callahan signed as a free agent with the Anaheim Ducks on July 12, 2007. Joe was then assigned to the Ducks affiliate, the Portland Pirates, where he spent the entire 2007–08 season.

On July 8, 2008, he signed a one-year contract with the New York Islanders. After starting the 2008–09 season with the Bridgeport Sound Tigers, Callahan made his NHL debut with the Islanders in a 4–3 defeat against the Philadelphia Flyers on December 9, 2008. Callahan finished the season, playing in 18 games.

On July 16, 2009, Callahan was signed by the San Jose Sharks on a one-year contract for the 2009–10 season. He scored 15 points in 35 games with the AHL's Worcester Sharks and recorded an assist in his lone San Jose appearance in a 2–1 defeat to the Detroit Red Wings on November 5, 2009.

On August 3, 2010, Callahan left the Sharks and signed a one-year free agent contract with the Florida Panthers. He split the 2010–11 season, between the Rochester Americans and the Panthers, appearing in a career-high 27 games.

On October 7, 2011, the Montreal Canadiens signed Callahan to a one-year, two-way contract. He was later reassigned by the Canadiens to AHL affiliate, the Hamilton Bulldogs, for the duration of his contract.

On July 24, 2012, Callahan signed a one-year AHL contract with the Abbotsford Heat.

Personal life
At Yale, Callahan's roommate was fellow professional hockey player and ex-Florida Panther teammate Chris Higgins.

Career statistics

References

External links

1982 births
Living people
Abbotsford Heat players
American men's ice hockey defensemen
Arizona Coyotes draft picks
Bridgeport Sound Tigers players
Florida Panthers players
Hamilton Bulldogs (AHL) players
Ice hockey players from Massachusetts
New York Islanders players
People from Abington, Massachusetts
Sportspeople from Brockton, Massachusetts
Portland Pirates players
Rochester Americans players
San Antonio Rampage players
San Jose Sharks players
Sportspeople from Plymouth County, Massachusetts
Springfield Falcons players
Utah Grizzlies (AHL) players
Worcester Sharks players
Yale Bulldogs men's ice hockey players